Blowing Rock is a rocky outcropping land feature in the town of Blowing Rock, North Carolina, above a gorge in the northern most portion of Caldwell County.

The prevailing wind blows through the gorge toward Blowing Rock. There, at the end of the gorge, the wind's path of least resistance is up the steep slopes surmounted by the outcropping, resulting in a nearly vertical and typically strong wind.

The legend of the Blowing Rock is that a Cherokee brave leapt from the rock into the wilderness below, only to have a gust of wind return him to his lover on top of the rock. This is a typical example of a lover's leap legend. Blowing Rock is private property; a fee for access is payable at the adjacent souvenir shop.

The 2008 feature film Goodbye Solo features Blowing Rock in its concluding scene.

References

External links 
 Blowing Rock website

Landforms of Caldwell County, North Carolina
Landforms of North Carolina
Tourist attractions in Caldwell County, North Carolina
Yadkin-Pee Dee River Basin
Rock formations of the United States